The 1978 Cupa României Final was the 40th final of Romania's most prestigious football cup competition. It was disputed between Universitatea Craiova and Olimpia Satu Mare, and was won by Universitatea Craiova after a game with 4 goals. It was the second cup for Universitatea Craiova.

Match details

See also 
List of Cupa României finals

References

External links
Romaniansoccer.ro

1978
Cupa
Romania
CS Universitatea Craiova matches